Alexander Shilov may refer to:

 Alexander E. Shilov (1930–2014), Russian chemist
 Alexander Ivanovich Shilov (died 1799), one of the founders of the Skoptzy sect
 Alexandr Shilov (born 1943), Soviet and Russian portrait painter